A gas spring, also known as a gas strut, is a type of spring that, unlike a typical mechanical spring that relies on elastic deformation, uses compressed gas contained within an enclosed cylinder sealed by a sliding piston to pneumatically store potential energy and withstand external force applied parallel to the direction of the piston shaft.

Common applications include automobiles (where they are incorporated into the design of struts that support the weight of the hatchback tailgate while they are open) and office chairs. They are also used in doors and windows of some buildings, alongside furniture, medical and aerospace applications. Much larger gas springs are found in machines that are used in industrial manufacturing (the press tooling industry), where the forces they are required to exert often range from 2500 N to 400,000 N (forty tonnes).

Gas springs are hydraulic, meaning they rely solely on pressure to function, and this results in a smooth extending and retracting motion.

Types
Gas springs are manufactured in many varieties including:

 Standard cylinder
 Fixed-height cylinder
 Spindle only
 Cable cylinder
 Stage cylinder
 Non-rotating cylinder
 Return cylinder (no height adjustment)
 Auto-return cylinder with height adjustment
 Bouncing cylinder
 Dual-mode cylinder
 Heavy duty cylinder
 Oil damper

Forms
If the internal plunger has a diaphragm which extends to the side of the gas tube, it will cease to move once an applied force is constant and will support a weight, like a normal spring. If a fine hole exists in the plunger, however, it is termed a "slow-dampened spring" and can be used on heavy doors and windows. A gas spring designed for fast operation is termed a "quick gas spring" and is used in the manufacture of air guns and recoil buffers.

Reducing the gas volume and hence increasing its internal pressure by means of a movable end stop, or allowing one tube to slide over another, can allow the characteristics of a gas spring to be adjusted during operation. The rod may be hollow by use of clever seals or may consist of multiple small-diameter rods. A small amount of oil is normally present.

The gas may be introduced by a Schrader-type valve, using a lip seal around the rod and forcing it to allow gas in by external overpressure or a shuttling O-ring system. Gas springs of high pressure contain a very large amount of energy, and can be used as a power pack. In emergency use, the gas may be introduced via a gas generator cell, similar to those used in airbags. Passive heave compensators feature large gas springs. The stroke lengths can exceed 6 meters.

Features
A variety of features are available from various manufacturers:

Adjustable push-in force via a local knob or remote via a bowden wire.
Single touch release to allow full extension or the ability to lock it out.
Extended stroke through telescoping mechanisms, usually composed of one rod and two cylinders (the smaller of the two cylinders actually acts as a second rod extending in and out of the larger cylinder).
 Vari-lift - intended for short production runs and prototypes, in applications where the exact force is important but hard to estimate in advance, such as lifting a lid slowly in a known time. In this case the cylinder is supplied filled to maximum design pressure, but equipped with a bleed port, to allow gas to be released once installed. The intention is that the design can be over-sprung, and then the pressure reduced in stages, to optimise behaviour. If too much gas is released, a new spring must be installed, and for large quantities, it is better to order a bespoke pressure setting from the maker.
Degressive springs where the spring becomes more, not less, powerful as the main cylinder expands.

See also 
 Shock absorber

References

Springs (mechanical)